Sinigarra napoense is a species of labeonin cyprinid fish known only from Guangxi Province, China.  This species grows to a length of  SL.  This species is the only known member of its genus.

Etymology 
The generic name is derived from the Latin Sinae, meaning China, and the labeonin genus Garra.  The specific epithet is derived from Napo County, the type locality.

References
 Zhang, E & Zhou, W. (2012): Sinigarra napoense, a new genus and species of labeonin fishes (Teleostei: Cyprinidae) from Guangxi Province, South China.  Zootaxa, 3586: 17–25.

Cyprinid fish of Asia
Fish described in 2012